Wokodot (Wo-ko'-dot) is a former Maidu village in Nevada County, California, that was located on the site of present-day Nevada City. It appears on a map published in 1905 by the American Museum of Natural History.

References

Former settlements in Nevada County, California
Former populated places in California
Maidu villages